Matthews is an unincorporated community in Talbot County, Maryland, United States. Rock Clift was listed on the National Register of Historic Places in 1980.

References

Unincorporated communities in Talbot County, Maryland
Unincorporated communities in Maryland